Unnatural Selection is a 1993 game for DOS by Maxis.

Gameplay
In the game, the player breeds mutant animals to fight battles. The game has two phases, the first is the breeding phase in which the player uses various objects and methods (food, drugs, radiation) etc. to breed the animals which will fight future battles. The second is the battle phase in which the animals are deployed on the battlefield in order to combat those of a rogue scientist.

Reception

A 1994 Computer Gaming World survey of strategic space games set in the year 2000 and later gave the game three-plus stars out of five, stating that it was "A different concept, almost carried off with success".

References

1993 video games
Artificial life
Biological simulation video games
DOS games
DOS-only games
Maxis Sim games
Video games about evolution
Video games developed in the United States
Video games set on fictional islands
Video games scored by Howard Drossin